Convolvulus farinosus is a species of plant in the family Convolvulaceae. It is native to sub-Saharan Africa.

References

farinosus
Flora of Botswana
Flora of the Cape Provinces
Flora of the Democratic Republic of the Congo
Flora of Eritrea
Flora of Ethiopia
Flora of Kenya
Flora of KwaZulu-Natal
Flora of Lesotho
Flora of Madagascar
Flora of Malawi
Flora of Mozambique
Flora of the Northern Provinces
Flora of Rwanda
Flora of Swaziland
Flora of Tanzania
Flora of Uganda
Flora of Yemen
Flora of Zambia
Flora of Zimbabwe